Setúbal is the main city in Setúbal Municipality, Portugal.

Setúbal may also refer to:
 Setúbal District, a district in Portugal.
 Setúbal Municipality, a municipality in Setúbal peninsula.
 Setúbal Peninsula, a peninsula in Portugal.
 Setúbal DOC or Moscatel de Setúbal, a Portuguese wine produced around the Setúbal Municipality on the Península de Setúbal.
 Vitória F.C. or Vitória de Setúbal, Portuguese sports club from the city of Setúbal.
 Setúbal (surname), surname

See also
 Península de Setúbal Subregion, a NUTS III subdivision of Lisbon Region (NUTS II), in Portugal.
 Setúbal Football Association, the governing body for the all football competitions in the Portuguese district of Setúbal.
 Monastery of Jesus of Setúbal, a historical religious building in the Manueline style in Setúbal.
, a number of steamships of this name